Neobarrettia spinosa, also known as the greater arid-land katydid, red eyed katydid (or red eyed devil), or giant Texas katydid, is a species of katydid native to the southwestern United States and northern Mexico.

Habitat 
Neobarrettia spinosa inhabits oak-juniper woodlands and arid-land deserts with mesquites or other brushes.

Biology 
Neobarrettia spinosa is a carnivorous insect. It stalks through the underbrush and consumes grasshoppers, other katydids, caterpillars, small frogs, lizards, and any other small animal it can overpower. It is a known predator of the endangered songbird, Vireo atricapilla. These animals present a threat posture when under attack, and will defend with a powerful bite and strong kick.

References

External links 
 Bugguide.net

Neobarrettia
Insects described in 1907